Lintneria merops is a moth of the  family Sphingidae.

Distribution 
It is found from western South America, including Venezuela, to Mexico, Belize, Guatemala, Nicaragua, Honduras and Costa Rica.

Description 
The wingspan is 103–122 mm.

Biology 
Adults have been recorded from April to January in Costa Rica.

The larvae feed on Lantana camara and probably other Verbenaceae species. The third instar has a dermal crest and yellow eye-spots on the sides. There are two black eye-spots on the last two instars.

References

Lintneria
Moths described in 1870
Sphingidae of South America
Moths of South America